Joyce Bland (10 May 1906 – 24 August 1963) was a Welsh film actress.

Early life
Joyce Bland was born in 1906, at Caerleon, Wales. She trained at the Royal Academy of Dramatic Arts.

Career
Bland made her stage debut on tour in 1927 in The Constant Nymph. She then returned to London and understudied Tallulah Bankhead. In 1935 she appeared in the historical play Mary Tudor.

Her interpretation of the role of Goneril in King Lear was considered "extraordinary" and "sinister". However, another critic referred to her as "the aptly named Joyce Bland," who "spoke finely" and "looked beautiful" as Desdemona in Othello at Stratford.

Later she went to North America where she appeared in Shakespearean roles.

Filmography

Film

References

1906 births
1963 deaths
Welsh film actresses
People from Caerleon
Alumni of RADA
Welsh stage actresses
20th-century British actresses